The discography of Pig Destroyer, an American grindcore band. The discography consists of six studio albums, two compilation albums, five extended plays (EPs), and five split albums.

Albums

Studio albums 
{|class="wikitable"
|-
! rowspan="1" width="40"| Year
! rowspan="1" width="225"| Album details
|-
| 1998
| Explosions in Ward 6
 Released: May 15, 1998
 Label: Clean Plate Records, Reservoir
|-
| 2001
| Prowler in the Yard
 Released: July 24, 2001
 Label: Relapse
|-
| 2004
| Terrifyer
 Released: October 12, 2004
 Label: Relapse
|-
| 2007
| Phantom Limb
 Released: June 12, 2007
 Label: Relapse
|-
| 2012
| Book Burner
 Released: October 22, 2012
 Label: Relapse
|-
|2018
| Head Cage
 Released: September 7, 2018
 Label: Relapse
|}

Compilation albums 
{|class="wikitable"
|-
! Year
! width="225"| Album details
|-
| 2000
| 38 Counts of Battery
 Released: November 28, 2000
 Label: Relapse
|-
| 2004
| Painter of Dead Girls
 Released: January 27, 2004
 Label: Robotic Empire
|-
|}

Extended plays 
{|class="wikitable"
|-
! Year
! width="225"| Album details
|-
| 1997
| Demo
 Released: 1997
 Label: Self-Release
|-
| 2000
| 7" Picture Disc
 Released: Early 2000
 Label: Reptillian
|-
| 2008
| Natasha
 Released: November 11, 2008
 Label: Relapse
|-
| 2013
| Mass & Volume
 Released: March 5, 2013
 Label: Relapse
|-
| 2020
| The Octagonal Stairway
 Released: August 28, 2020
 Label: Relapse
|-
|}

Split albums
{|class="wikitable"
|-
! Year
! width="225"| Album details
|-
| 1997
| Split with Orchid
 Released: November, 1997
 Label: Amendment
 Split with: Orchid
|-
| 1999
| Split with Gnob
 Released: October, 1999
 Label: Robotic Empire
 Split with: Gnob
|-
| 2000
| Split with Isis
 Released: July, 2000
 Label: Relapse
 Split with: Isis
|-
| 2002
| Split with Benümb
 Released: February 19, 2002
 Label: Robotic Empire
 Split with: Benümb
|-
| 2007
| Split with Coldworker and Antigama
 Released: May, 2007
 Label: Relapse
 Split with: Coldworker and Antigama
|-
|}

Songs

Singles
{|class="wikitable"
|-
! Year
! width="225"| Album details
|-
| 2013
| The Octagonal Stairway
 Released: September 3, 2013
 Album: Adult Swim Singles Series
 Label: Williams Street Records
|-
|2019
|The Cavalry
 Released: April, 2019
 Label: Decibel (magazine)
|-
|}

Guest appearances
{|class="wikitable"
|+ List of non-single guest appearances, showing year released and album name
|-
! Year
! Song
! Album
|-
| 2000
| Delusional Supremacy
| Contaminated 3.0
|-
| 2003
| "Mapplethorpe Grey"
| Contaminated 5.0
|-
| 2004
| "Terrifyer"
| Contaminated, Vol. 6
|-
| 2004
| "Blonde Prostitute"
| BMA vs Metal Blade vs Robotic Empire: Sampler 2004
|-
| 2005
| "Gravedancer"
| Contaminated: Relapse Records Sampler, Vol. 7
|-
| 2005
| "Gravedancer"
| Relapse Records Extreme Music Sampler
|-
| 2005
| "Claude"
| We Reach: The Music of the Melvins
|-
| 2008
| "Scarlet Hourglass" & "Cheerleader Corpses"
| Grind Your Mind – A History of Grindcore
|-
|}

Videos

Music videos
{|class="wikitable"
|-
! Year
! Song
! Director
! Album
|-
| 2001
| Piss Angel
| Kenneth Thibault & Nathaniel Baruch
| Prowler In The Yard
|-
| 2004
| "Gravedancer"
| Vladimir Lik
| Terrifyer
|-
| 2007
| "Loathsome"
| Dave Brodsky
| Phantom Limb
|-
| 2012
| "The Diplomat"
| Phil Mucci
| Book Burner
|-
|rowspan="3"| 2018
| "Army of Cops"
| Dave Brodsky
|rowspan="3"| Head Cage
|-
| "The Torture Fields"
| Frank Huang
|-
| "Mt. Skull"
| Joe Stakun
|-
| 2020
| "The Cavalry"
| Frank Huang
| The Octagonal Stairway
|}

References

External links
 Pig Destroyer on Bandcamp
 Pig Destroyer at AllMusic
 Pig Destroyer at Discogs
 Pig Destroyer at Rate Your Music

Heavy metal group discographies
Discographies of American artists